The discography of Brian McKnight, an R&B singer, consists of 15 studio albums (including two Christmas albums), six compilation albums, more than 40 singles, and 19 music videos. McKnight has sold more than 25 million albums worldwide.

McKnight signed a record deal with Mercury Records in 1992, and released his eponymous debut album in the same year. In the United States, Brian McKnight peaked at number fifty-eight on the Billboard 200, peaked at number seventeen on the Top R&B/Hip-Hop Albums, and was certified platinum by the Recording Industry Association of America (RIAA). The album produced four singles, all which charted above fifty in the Hot R&B/Hip Hop Songs. McKnight's second studio album, I Remember You, was released in 1995. It peaked at number twenty-two on the US Billboard 200 and reached at number four on the Top R&B/Hip-Hop Albums. It was certified gold by the RIAA and produced three singles, all which charted above twenty-five in the Hot R&B/Hip Hop Songs. McKnight's final record with Mercury was his third studio album, Anytime (1997). It peaked at number thirteen on the US Billboard 200, became his first record to top the Top R&B/Hip-Hop Albums. It was certified double platinum by the RIAA, and produced four singles, three of which charted above fifteen in the Hot R&B/Hip Hop Songs.

McKnight followed with the release of the Christmas album, Bethlehem (1998), his first record for Motown Records. His fifth studio album, Back at One, was released in 1999 and saw him further transitioning from urban adult contemporary into the hip hop soul market. It sold 144,000 units in its first week of release, reaching number seven on the US Billboard 200. McKnight's most successful album to date, it sold more than 3.0 million copies worldwide and was certified triple platinum by the Recording Industry Association of America (RIAA) and platinum by Music Canada. The album produced three singles, including its title track which reached number two in the US. McKnight followed this with his sixth studio album, Superhero, released in 2001. It debuted at number seven on the US Billboard 200, moving 153,000 units in its first week to McKnight's biggest first week sales. However, It failed to duplicate the multi-platinum success of Back at One, going gold. McKnight followed with the release of his first compilation album, From There to Here: 1989-2002 (2002), which peaked at number sixty-two on the Billboard 200 and number 21 on the Top R&B/Hip-Hop Albums. In 2003 and 2005, McKnight released the studio albums, U-Turn and Gemini, respectively. While the became top ten hits on the Billboard 200, they were less successful, with only U-Turn certified gold by the RIAA.

Following a label change, McKnight released his ninth studio album, Ten, on Warner Bros. Records in 2006. It peaked at number 32 on the Billboard 200, becoming his lowest-charting single album since his debut album. McKnight followed with the release of the compilation albums Gold (2007) and 20th Century Masters: The Millennium Collection - The Best of Brian McKnight (2007), which peaked at number sixty-five on the Top R&B/Hip-Hop Albums. McKnight also released his second Christmas album, I'll Be Home for Christmas (2008) via Razor & Tie, which peaked at number twenty-two on the Top R&B/Hip-Hop Albums. In 2009, he signed with E1 Music and produced his eleventh studio album, Evolution of a Man, in 2009. It entered the top twenty of the Billboard 200 and peaked at number three on the Top R&B/Hip-Hop Albums chart. This was followed by Just Me in 2011 and More Than Words in 2013. McKnight's fourteenth studio album, Better, was self-released in 2016. It became his first regular studio album to miss the Billboard 200 and reached number 23 on the Top R&B/Hip-Hop Albums. Also in 2016, SoNo Recording Group released his first live album An Evening with Brian McKnight. It peaked at number 29 on the Top R&B/Hip-Hop Albums. SoNo also released McKnight's fifteenth studio album, Genesis in 2017. It entered the top twenty of the Independent Albums chart.

Albums

Studio albums

Live albums

Compilation albums

Singles

As main artist

As featured artist

Other charted songs

Guest appearances

Soundtrack appearances

Music videos

Notes 
 A  "Still in Love" did not enter the Billboard Hot 100 but peaked at number 3 on Bubbling Under Hot 100 Singles, which acts as a 25-song extension to the Hot 100.
 B  "6, 8, 12" did not enter the Billboard Hot 100 but peaked at number 8 on Bubbling Under Hot 100 Singles, which acts as a 25-song extension to the Hot 100.
 C  "Win" did not enter the Billboard Hot 100 but peaked at number twenty-five on Bubbling Under Hot 100 Singles, which acts as a 25-song extension to the Hot 100.
 D  "Still" did not enter the Billboard Hot 100 but peaked at number fifteen on Bubbling Under Hot 100 Singles, which acts as a 25-song extension to the Hot 100.
 E  "Shoulda, Woulda, Coulda" did not enter the Billboard Hot 100 but peaked at number 6 on Bubbling Under Hot 100 Singles, which acts as a 25-song extension to the Hot 100.
 F  "What We Do Here" did not enter the Billboard Hot 100 but peaked at number twelve on Bubbling Under Hot 100 Singles, which acts as a 25-song extension to the Hot 100.
 G  "Everytime You Go Away" did not enter the Billboard Hot 100 but peaked at number eleven on Bubbling Under Hot 100 Singles, which acts as a 25-song extension to the Hot 100.
 H  "Find Myself in You" did not enter the Billboard Hot 100 but peaked at number 9 on Bubbling Under Hot 100 Singles, which acts as a 25-song extension to the Hot 100.
 G  "Used to Be My Girl" did not enter the Billboard Hot 100 but peaked at number fourteen on Bubbling Under Hot 100 Singles, which acts as a 25-song extension to the Hot 100.

References

General
 
 

Specific

External links
 Official Website of Brian McKnight
 [ Brian McKnight overview] at Allmusic

Rhythm and blues discographies
Discographies of American artists